Nils Fröling (born 20 April 2000) is a Swedish professional footballer who plays as a forward for 2. Bundesliga club Hansa Rostock.

Club career

Early career 
Fröling made his first senior team practice with Division 5 team Boo FF at only 13 years. After having played in 11 games for Boo FF during the 2016 spring season in Division 5, Fröling left Boo FF to join Åtvidabergs FF. He made his Åtvidaberg debut in 2017, and played in ten games as Åtvidaberg was relegated from Superettan at the end of the season.

Kalmar FF 
Fröling was signed by Kalmar FF ahead of the 2018 Allsvenskan season. He scored his first Allsvenskan goal in a 1–0 win at home against IK Sirius on 14 May 2018.

Hansa Rostock 
Fröling moved to 2. Bundesliga club Hansa Rostock in December 2021. He signed a contract until summer 2025.

International career 
Fröling has represented the Sweden U19 and U21 teams. He is eligible to play for both the Sweden and United States national teams.

Personal life 
Fröling was born to Swedish parents in Dallas, Texas.

Career statistics

Club

References

External links
 
 

2000 births
Living people
Soccer players from Texas
Swedish footballers
Association football forwards
Åtvidabergs FF players
Kalmar FF players
FC Hansa Rostock players
Allsvenskan players
2. Bundesliga players
Swedish expatriate footballers
Swedish expatriate sportspeople in Germany
Expatriate footballers in Germany